The Million Fax on Washington was a November 2008 – January 2009 petition aimed at influencing President-elect of the United States Barack Obama to focus the attention of his new administration on the conspiracy theory that claims indications of an extraterrestrial presence on Earth and in our skies. The event was organized by Paradigm Research, a Maryland-based corporation that organizes UFO events. The goal of the Million Fax on Washington project was to reach 40,000 faxes sent to the administration in the 77-day period between election day November 4, 2008  and the presidential inauguration on January 20, 2009.

References

Petitions
Political campaigns
Protests in the United States
Government responses to UFOs
2008 in American politics
2009 in American politics